Corroy is a village in County Mayo in Ireland. It lies on the R310 regional road  between the town of Ballina and the village of Knockmore in the Parish of Backs.

See also
 List of towns and villages in Ireland

References 

Towns and villages in County Mayo